The 2020–21 season will be Budafoki MTE's 2nd competitive season, 1st consecutive season in the OTP Bank Liga and 109th year in existence as a football club.

Transfers

Summer

In:

Out:

Source:

Winter

In:

Out:

Source:

Nemzeti Bajnokság I

League table

Results summary

Results by round

Matches

Hungarian Cup

Statistics

Appearances and goals
Last updated on 15 May 2021.

|-
|colspan="14"|Out to loan:

|-
|colspan="14"|Players no longer at the club:

|}

Top scorers
Includes all competitive matches. The list is sorted by shirt number when total goals are equal.
Last updated on 15 May 2021

Disciplinary record
Includes all competitive matches. Players with 1 card or more included only.

Last updated on 15 May 2021

Overall
{|class="wikitable"
|-
|Games played || 38 (33 Nemzeti Bajnokság I and 5 Hungarian Cup)
|-
|Games won || 11 (7 Nemzeti Bajnokság I and 4 Hungarian Cup)
|-
|Games drawn || 6 (6 Nemzeti Bajnokság I and 0 Hungarian Cup)
|-
|Games lost || 21 (20 Nemzeti Bajnokság I and 1 Hungarian Cup)
|-
|Goals scored || 58
|-
|Goals conceded || 80
|-
|Goal difference || -22
|-
|Yellow cards || 78
|-
|Red cards || 4
|-
|rowspan="1"|Worst discipline ||  András Huszti (6 , 2 )
|-
|rowspan="1"|Best result || 11–0 (A) v Dunavarsány - Hungarian Cup - 10-2-2021
|-
|rowspan="1"|Worst result || 2–9 (H) v Paks - Nemzeti Bajnokság I - 24-4-2021
|-
|rowspan="1"|Most appearances ||  Dávid Kovács (38 appearances)
|-
|rowspan="1"|Top scorer ||  Dávid Kovács (12 goals)
|-
|Points || 39/114 (34.21%)
|-

References

External links
 Official Website 
 fixtures and results
 History and others

Budafoki MTE
Hungarian football clubs 2020–21 season